Scott Lewis Young (born July 15, 1981) is a retired American football guard. He was drafted by the Philadelphia Eagles in the fifth round of the 2005 NFL Draft. He played college football at BYU.

Young also played for the Cleveland Browns and Denver Broncos.

Early years
Young attended Hillcrest High School in Midvale, Utah, and was a three-year letterman in football.  He is the son of a police officer and an elementary school teacher.  According to The Philadelphia Inquirer Young is an Eagle Scout with 64 merit badges.

College career
Young was a two-year starter at Dixie State College (when it was still a junior college), and led Dixie with 15.5 sacks as a sophomore. He transferred to Brigham Young in 2002.

Professional career

2005 NFL Draft
Projected to be a third-round selection, Young was listed as the No. 8 offensive guard prospect in the 2005 NFL Draft by Sports Illustrated. , Young is one of only 17 prospects to repeat more than 40 lifts at the  bench press at the NFL Scouting Combine since 1999. While noted for his upper body strength, his lack of a "dominant base" was criticized by NFL scouts.

Retirement
Young announced his retirement from the NFL on Thursday, April 16, 2009, a month after signing with the Broncos.

References

External links
BYU Cougars bio

1981 births
Living people
People from Midvale, Utah
American Latter Day Saints
American football offensive guards
BYU Cougars football players
Philadelphia Eagles players
Cleveland Browns players
Denver Broncos players
Utah Tech Trailblazers football players
Players of American football from Utah